The third season of Ang Probinsyano, a Philippine action drama television series, premiered on May 25, 2017, on ABS-CBN's Primetime Bida evening block and worldwide on The Filipino Channel and concluded on November 7, 2017, with a total of 119 episodes. The series stars Coco Martin as SPO2 Ricardo Dalisay, together with an ensemble cast consisting of Susan Roces, Jaime Fabregas, Angel Aquino, John Arcilla, Jhong Hilario, John Prats, Sid Lucero, Mitch Valdes, Pokwang, Yassi Pressman, Eddie Garcia, and Lito Lapid.

The third season of Ang Probinsyano shows Ricardo Dalisay's married life and how he is thrust back into the police force to battle rebels. After an ill-fated mission, he goes undercover and infiltrates the rebel group Pulang Araw to uncover the mystery of who is the true ally and who is the real enemy.

Plot 

As Cardo (posing under the name Fernan) joins various missions of Pulang Araw, his perception about the rebel group quickly changes, realizing that their public image is based on lies and carefully concocted smear campaign by Director Hipolito. Back in Manila, the propaganda stories about Cardo and Pulang Araw confuses Cardo's family, negatively affecting their lives. Rumours spread about Cardo’s survival and supposed defection to Pulang Araw, a story which Director Hipolito (John Arcilla) and Major Catindig (Sid Lucero) capitalize to destroy Cardo's credibility, blow his cover and jeopardize his safety. At the camp, Cardo also has to deal with comrade rivalries arising from Alakdan (Jhong Hilario) and a jealous Anton del Mundo alias "Tigre" (Mark Lapid), both intent on discrediting Cardo or exposing him as a fraud.

After determining that Pulang Araw is not behind the acts of terrorism, he tries to win the trust of Alakdan to infiltrate the Kamandag faction of Pulang Araw. In the meantime, he discovers that dela Paz (Ejay Falcon) and Velasco (Louise delos Reyes) are held captive and helps them escape from the hands of Pulang Araw. He tells them of his discovery that Kamandag is protected by an unknown government official who is twisting facts to demonize Pulang Araw. Velasco and dela Paz realize that Kamandag's protector is also discrediting Cardo. They hold a press conference reporting Cardo’s death while trying to escape from Pulang Araw with them to ensure his cover.

Cardo wins Alakdan's trust and sends him to Manila to eliminate Director Hipolito's fiercest rival in the senate race, Senator Mateo F. de Silva (Joko Diaz) by detonating a bomb among the crowd just before de Silva announces his candidacy. Cardo manages the disruption without detonating a bomb and narrowly escapes de Silva and his men. The following day, Cardo assaults Kamandag to avenge the death of his son, sending a wounded Alakdan and the rest of Kamandag packing. Cardo then informs Pulang Araw of the betrayal and acts of terrorism that Alakdan perpetrated.

To boost his poll ratings, Director Hipolito resolves to wipe out Pulang Araw and orders a strike on their stronghold in Mt. Karagao. The ensuing encounter that results in the deaths of Lawin (Dante Rivero), Lena (Yam Concepcion) and Lena's son, Emman (Emmanuel Matteo Gabriel Plan), leads to Leon’s (Lito Lapid) discovery that Cardo is a SAF member.Romulo and Cardo engage in a knife dueling club on top of the mountain hill and then the true and real enemy is unmasked that turns out to be Homer "Alakdan" Adlawan and his sectarian group responsible for the bombing in Manila.Cardo and Leon resolve to join forces in order to take down Alakdan.

Cast and characters 

Main cast
 Coco Martin as SPO2 Ricardo "Cardo" Dalisay
 John Arcilla as Director Renato "Buwitre" Hipolito
 Jaime Fábregas as P/Dir. Delfin S. Borja
 Angel Aquino as BGen. Diana T. Olegario
 Jhong Hilario as Homer "Alakdan" Adlawan
 John Prats as SPO3 Jerome Girona, Jr.
 Sid Lucero as Maj. Manolo "Nolo" Catindig
 Pokwang as Amor Nieves
 Mitch Valdes as Kapitana Gina Magtanggol
 Ronwaldo Martin as Roldan/Gagamba
 Yassi Pressman as Alyana R. Arevalo-Dalisay
 Susan Roces as Flora "Lola Kap" S. Borja-de Leon 
 Eddie Garcia as Don Emilio Syquia

Recurring cast
 Malou Crisologo as Yolanda "Yolly" Capuyao-Santos
 Marvin Yap as Elmo Santos
 John Medina as PS/Insp. Avel "Billy" M. Guzman
 Lester Llansang as Police PS/Insp. Mark Vargas
 Michael Roy Jornales as PS/Insp. Francisco "Chikoy" Rivera
 Marc Solis as SPO1 Rigor Soriano
 Long Mejia as Francisco "Paco" Alvarado
 PJ Endrinal as Wally Nieves
 Benj Manalo as Felipe "Pinggoy" Tanyag, Jr.
 Jeffrey Tam as Otep
 Pedro "Zaito" Canon, Jr. as Nick
 Roy "Shernan" Gaite as Gido
 Jay Gonzaga as James Cordero
 Arlene Tolibas as Marikit Flores
 Gary Lim as Gaspar Romero
 Sancho delas Alas as Gregorio "Greco" Cortez
 Simon Ezekiel Pineda as Honorio "Onyok" Amaba 
 McNeal "Awra" Briguela as Macario "Makmak" Samonte, Jr. 
 James "Paquito" Sagarino as Paquito Alvarado
 Rhian "Dang" Ramos as Amanda "Dang" Ignacio
 Shantel Crislyn Layh "Ligaya" Ngujo as Ligaya Dungalo
 Enzo Pelojero as Dexter Flores
 Joel Torre as Teodoro "Teddy" Arevalo
 Shamaine Centenera-Buencamino as Virginia "Virgie" R. Arevalo
 McCoy de Leon as Juan Pablo "JP" R. Arevalo

Guest cast

Episodes

References

External links

2017 Philippine television seasons